Peter Toussaint is a Dutch singer-songwriter and musician, who has been living in Pretoria, South Africa since 2003.
He played with De Niro in the Netherlands.

Band history

In 2003 he moved to Pretoria, South Africa where he formed The Fake Leather Blues Band, together with brothers Conrad and Franco Jamneck.
In 2010, Mozambican born Pedro Barbosa formed together with Peter The Barbosa Experience and in that year he also joined Hoot 'n Anny, together with Franco Jamneck and his wife Alouise. 
Looking to press his own stamp, he formed the Peter Toussaint Band in 2016 with Franco Jamneck and Wim van Vuuren. In 2017 Wim stopped due to not having enough time and Lourene Mostert (Tuin Band) stepped in on bass. Franco played drums in the band until Lourene moved to Europe in 2017.
In 2020 Peter formed Fourth Son South.

Discography
with De Niro:
 Flushing Boulevard (1998)
 Upstairs (2000)
with Hoot 'n Anny
 Countrees (2015)
with The Barbosa Experience
 I Got no Money (2016)
As Peter Toussaint
 One Day (Peter Toussaint album) (2017)

Band members

Peter Toussaint – lead guitar and vocals
Franco Jamneck – bass and back-up vocals
Jason Venter– drums

References

Year of birth missing (living people)
Living people
Dutch guitarists
Dutch singer-songwriters
Dutch expatriates in South Africa
Musicians from Zeeland
Place of birth missing (living people)
South African guitarists
South African singer-songwriters